Weches is an unincorporated community in Houston County, Texas, United States.  It is located along the route of the Old San Antonio Road near the Neches River, about twenty-one miles northeast of Crockett. The population was 26  according to the 2000 census.

History
Weches was founded around 1847 by T. J. Hennin near a large village of Tejas Indians and the San Francisco de los Tejas Mission. Hennin chose to name the settlement Neches after the nearby river. A post office operated under that name from January 1847 to July 1848 and under the name Naches from 1853 until 1882.  In 1887 an application was made for a new post office, however the name Neches had, in the interim, been designated for another town.  With duplicate names prohibited by the postal service, the citizens changed the name to Weches.

Education 
Weches is served by both the Kennard Independent School District and the Grapeland Independent School District.

References

External links
 

Unincorporated communities in Houston County, Texas
Unincorporated communities in Texas